RAF Mepal is a former RAF station located   south of Mepal, Cambridgeshire, England and  west of Ely. Construction commenced in July 1942 and opened in June 1943.

History
Mepal first hosted No. 75 (NZ) Squadron RAF flying Short Stirlings and later Avro Lancasters.

Tiger Force
It was used towards the end of the Second World War to prepare Avro Lancaster bombers squadrons such as No. 44 (Rhodesia) squadron for use in Tiger Force which was to bomb Japan.

Thor missiles
From 1957 PGM-17 Thor missiles were based at the airfield in the north east corner.

Current use
Very little remains of the original site, most of it razed to the ground after the USAF and their Thor missiles left. The site is now the Elean business park and is home to the world's only straw burning power station and a few manufacturing and warehousing operations. A small memorial plaque is in place at the entrance to the site.

See also
 List of former Royal Air Force stations

References

External links

 Royal Air Force - Bomber Command
 Airfield Archaeology - Memorials

Defunct airports in England
Royal Air Force stations in Cambridgeshire
Royal Air Force stations of World War II in the United Kingdom
Military units and formations established in 1942
Military units and formations disestablished in 1963